Romolo Catasta (26 March 1923 – 26 March 1985) was an Italian rower who competed in the 1948 Summer Olympics. Catasta was born in Vienna, Austria, in 1923. In 1948 he won the bronze medal in the single sculls event.

References

1923 births
1985 deaths
Italian male rowers
Olympic rowers of Italy
Rowers at the 1948 Summer Olympics
Olympic bronze medalists for Italy
Olympic medalists in rowing
Medalists at the 1948 Summer Olympics
20th-century Italian people